India Ennenga (born November 16, 1994) is an American actress.

She is known for her roles as Sofia Bernette in the HBO series Treme, Camille Winship in the A&E drama The Returned and the voice of the titlular character in the Nick Jr. animated series Pinky Dinky Doo.

Ennenga currently is based in New York City. She is co-founder of publishing company isolarii.

Early life and education
Ennenga was born in New York City. Her mother is filmmaker Laurie Weltz. She attended Saint Ann's School in Brooklyn, New York City.
She attended Brown University, where she graduated cum laude with a bachelor of arts degree in Comparative Literature.

Later, Ennenga received professional training at LAMDA.

Career

Writing
Her essay "Towards a More Radical Selfie," on social media, feminism and Mary Knowles was published in The Paris Review in November 2018.

Television
In 2006, Ennenga began her voice role as the title character in the animated series Pinky Dinky Doo. She later starred in the HBO series Treme as Sofia Bernette in 2010 and the A&E drama The Returned as Camille Winship in 2015. She recently starred in the Netflix series Inventing Anna as Julia Reed in 2022.

Film
Ennenga's first film role was as Sophie in The Last International Playboy. She then starred in the 2008 feature film The Women. She played Molly Haines, the daughter of Mary Haines (played by Meg Ryan). Other film credits include Multiple Sarcasms (2010), Nobody Walks (2012), Sun Belt Express (2014), About Scout (2015) and Charlie Says (2018).

She also appeared as Dolores Sheeran in Martin Scorsese's 2019 film The Irishman.

Filmography

Film

Television

References

External links
 
 

1994 births
Living people
21st-century American actresses
Actresses from New York City
American child actresses
American film actresses
American television actresses
Brown University alumni
Saint Ann's School (Brooklyn) alumni
American expatriate actresses in the United Kingdom